Luigi Pirandello (28 June 1867 – 10 December 1936) was an Italian dramatist, novelist, poet, and short story writer whose greatest contributions were his plays. He was awarded the 1934 Nobel Prize in Literature for "his almost magical power to turn psychological analysis into good theatre." Pirandello's works include novels, hundreds of short stories, and about 40 plays, some of which are written in Sicilian. Pirandello's tragic farces are often seen as forerunners of the Theatre of the Absurd.

Biography

Early life

Pirandello was born into an upper-class family in an area called "Caos" ("Chaos" in Italian, but in Sicilian dialect lit. "Trouser", from the shape of a nearby ravine), near Porto Empedocle, a poor suburb of Girgenti (Agrigento, a town in southern Sicily). His father, Stefano, belonged to a wealthy family involved in the sulphur industry, and his mother, Caterina Ricci Gramitto, was also of a well-to-do background, descending from a family of the bourgeois professional class of Agrigento. Both families, the Pirandellos and the Ricci Gramittos, were ferociously anti-Bourbon and actively participated in the struggle for unification and democracy ("Il Risorgimento"). Stefano participated in the famous Expedition of the Thousand, later following Garibaldi all the way to the battle of Aspromonte, and Caterina, who had hardly reached the age of thirteen, was forced to accompany her father to Malta, where he had been sent into exile by the Bourbon monarchy. But the open participation in the Garibaldian cause and the strong sense of idealism of those early years were quickly transformed, above all in Caterina, into an angry and bitter disappointment with the new reality created by the unification. Pirandello would eventually assimilate this sense of betrayal and resentment and express it in several of his poems and in his novel The Old and the Young. It is also probable that this climate of disillusion inculcated in the young Luigi the sense of disproportion between ideals and reality which is recognizable in his essay on humorism (L'Umorismo). 

Pirandello received his elementary education at home, but was much more fascinated by the fables and legends, somewhere between popular and magic, that his elderly servant Maria Stella used to recount to him than by anything scholastic or academic. By the age of twelve, he had already written his first tragedy. At the insistence of his father, he was registered at a technical school, but eventually switched to the study of the humanities at the ginnasio, something which had always attracted him.

In 1880, the Pirandello family moved to Palermo. It was here, in the capital of Sicily, that Luigi completed his high school education. He also began reading omnivorously, focusing, above all, on 19th-century Italian poets such as Giosuè Carducci and Arturo Graf. He then started writing his first poems and fell in love with his cousin Lina.

During this period, the first signs of serious differences arose between Luigi and his father; Luigi had discovered some notes revealing the existence of Stefano's extramarital relations. As a reaction to the ever-increasing distrust and disharmony that Luigi was developing toward his father, a man of a robust physique and crude manners, his attachment to his mother would continue growing to the point of profound veneration. This later expressed itself, after her death, in the moving pages of the novella Colloqui con i personaggi in 1915.

His romantic feelings for his cousin, initially looked upon with disfavour, were suddenly taken very seriously by Lina's family. They demanded that Luigi abandon his studies and dedicate himself to the sulphur business so that he could immediately marry her. In 1886, during a vacation from school, Luigi went to visit the sulphur mines of Porto Empedocle and started working with his father. This experience was essential to him and would provide the basis for such stories as Il Fumo, Ciàula scopre la Luna as well as some of the descriptions and background in the novel The Old and the Young. The marriage, which had seemed imminent, was postponed.

Pirandello then registered at the University of Palermo in the departments of Law and of Letters. The campus at Palermo, and above all the Department of Law, was the centre in those years of the vast movement which would eventually evolve into the Fasci Siciliani. Although Pirandello was not an active member of this movement, he had close ties of friendship with its leading ideologists: Rosario Garibaldi Bosco, Enrico La Loggia, Giuseppe De Felice Giuffrida and Francesco De Luca.

Higher education
In 1887, having definitively chosen the Department of Letters, he moved to Rome in order to continue his studies. But the encounter with the city, centre of the struggle for unification to which the families of his parents had participated with generous enthusiasm, was disappointing and nothing close to what he had expected. "When I arrived in Rome it was raining hard, it was night time and I felt like my heart was being crushed, but then I laughed like a man in the throes of desperation."

Pirandello, who was an extremely sensitive moralist, finally had a chance to see for himself the irreducible decadence of the so-called heroes of the Risorgimento in the person of his uncle Rocco, now a greying and exhausted functionary of the prefecture who provided him with temporary lodgings in Rome. The "desperate laugh",the only manifestation of revenge for the disappointment undergone, inspired the bitter verses of his first collection of poems, Mal Giocondo (1889). But not all was negative; this first visit to Rome provided him with the opportunity to assiduously visit the many theatres of the capital: Il Nazionale, Il Valle, il Manzoni. "Oh the dramatic theatre! I will conquer it. I cannot enter into one without experiencing a strange sensation, an excitement of the blood through all my veins..."

Because of a conflict with a Latin professor, he was forced to leave the University of Rome and went to Bonn with a letter of presentation from one of his other professors. The stay in Bonn, which lasted two years, was fervid with cultural life. He read the German romantics, Jean Paul, Tieck, Chamisso, Heinrich Heine and Goethe. He began translating the Roman Elegies of Goethe, composed the Elegie Boreali in imitation of the style of the Roman Elegies, and he began to meditate on the topic of humorism by way of the works of Cecco Angiolieri.

In March 1891 he received his doctorate in Romance Philology with a dissertation on the dialect of Agrigento: Sounds and Developments of Sounds in the Speech of Craperallis.

Marriage
After a brief sojourn in Sicily, during which the planned marriage with his cousin was finally called off, he returned to Rome, where he became friends with a group of writer-journalists including Ugo Fleres, Tomaso Gnoli, Giustino Ferri and Luigi Capuana. Capuana encouraged Pirandello to dedicate himself to narrative writing. In 1893 he wrote his first important work, Marta Ajala, which was published in 1901 as l'Esclusa. In 1894 he published his first collection of short stories, Amori senza Amore. He also married in 1894, choosing (on his father's suggestion) a shy, withdrawn girl of a good family of Agrigentine origin educated by the nuns of San Vincenzo: Maria Antonietta Portulano.

The first years of matrimony brought on in him a new fervour for his studies and writings: his encounters with his friends and the discussions on art continued, more vivacious and stimulating than ever, while his family life, despite the complete incomprehension of his wife with respect to the artistic vocation of her husband, proceeded relatively tranquilly with the birth of two sons (Stefano and Fausto) and a daughter (Rosalia "Lietta"). In the meantime, Pirandello intensified his collaborations with newspaper editors and other journalists in magazines such as La Critica and La Tavola Rotonda in which he published, in 1895, the first part of the Dialoghi tra Il Gran Me e Il Piccolo Me.

In 1897 he accepted an offer to teach Italian at the Istituto Superiore di Magistero di Roma, and in the magazine Il Marzocco he published several more pages of the Dialogi. In 1898, with Italo Falbo and Ugo Fleres, he founded the weekly Ariel, in which he published the one-act play L'Epilogo (later changed to La Morsa) and some novellas (La Scelta, Se...). The end of the 19th century and the beginnings of the 20th were a period of extreme productivity for Pirandello. In 1900, he published in Il Marzocco some of the most celebrated of his novellas (Lumie di Sicilia, La Paura del Sonno...) and, in 1901, the collection of poems Zampogna. In 1902 he published the first series of Beffe della Morte e della Vita and his second novel, Il Turno.

Family disaster
The year 1903 was fundamental to the life of Pirandello. The flooding of the sulphur mines of Aragona, in which his father Stefano had invested not only an enormous amount of his own capital but also Antonietta's dowry, precipitated the financial collapse of the family. Antonietta, after opening and reading the letter announcing the catastrophe, entered into a state of semi-catatonia and underwent such a psychological shock that her mental balance remained profoundly and irremediably shaken.

Pirandello, who had initially harboured thoughts of suicide, attempted to remedy the situation as best he could by increasing the number of his lessons in both Italian and German and asking for compensation from the magazines to which he had freely given away his writings and collaborations. In the magazine New Anthology, directed by G. Cena, meanwhile, the novel which Pirandello had been writing while in this horrible situation (watching over his mentally ill wife at night after an entire day spent at work) began appearing in episodes. The title was Il Fu Mattia Pascal (The Late Mattia Pascal). This novel contains many autobiographical elements that have been fantastically re-elaborated. It was an immediate and resounding success. Translated into German in 1905, this novel paved the way to the notoriety and fame which allowed Pirandello to publish with the more important firms such as Treves, with whom he published, in 1906, another collection of novellas Erma Bifronte. In 1908 he published a volume of essays entitled Arte e Scienza and the important essay L'Umorismo, in which he initiated the legendary debate with Benedetto Croce that would continue with increasing bitterness and venom on both sides for many years.

In 1905 he took his wife to stay in Chianciano Terme together with their children where they stay there for two months in what the writer called the village nestled on the windy hill right in opposite the Collegiata. Two short stories contained in the book Short stories for a year are coveted in this country: Bitter water and Pallino and Mimì.

In 1909 the first part of I Vecchi e I Giovani was published in episodes. This novel retraces the history of the failure and repression of the Fasci Siciliani in the period from 1893 to 1894. When the novel came out in 1913 Pirandello sent a copy of it to his parents for their fiftieth wedding anniversary along with a dedication which said that "their names, Stefano and Caterina, live heroically." However, while the mother is transfigured in the novel into the otherworldly figure of Caterina Laurentano, the father, represented by the husband of Caterina, Stefano Auriti, appears only in memories and flashbacks, since, as was acutely observed by Leonardo Sciascia, "he died censured in a Freudian sense by his son who, in the bottom of his soul, is his enemy." Also in 1909, Pirandello began his collaboration with the prestigious journal Corriere della Sera in which he published the novellas Mondo di Carta (World of Paper), La Giara, and, in 1910, Non è una cosa seria and Pensaci, Giacomino! (Think it over, Giacomino!) At this point Pirandello's fame as a writer was continually increasing. His private life, however, was poisoned by the suspicion and obsessive jealousy of Antonietta who began turning physically violent.

In 1911, while the publication of novellas and short stories continued, Pirandello finished his fourth novel, Suo Marito, republished posthumously (1941), and completely revised in the first four chapters, with the title Giustino Roncella nato Boggiòlo. During his life the author never republished this novel for reasons of discretion; within are implicit references to the writer Grazia Deledda. But the work which absorbed most of his energies at this time was the collection of stories La Vendetta del Cane, Quando s'è capito il giuoco, Il treno ha fischiato, Filo d'aria and Berecche e la guerra. They were all published from 1913 to 1914 and are all now considered classics of Italian literature.

First World War
As Italy entered the First World War, Pirandello's son Stefano volunteered for service and was taken prisoner by the Austro-Hungarians. In 1916 the actor Angelo Musco successfully recited the three-act comedy that the writer had extracted from the novella Pensaci, Giacomino! and the pastoral comedy Liolà.

In 1917 the collection of novellas E domani Lunedì (And Tomorrow, Monday...) was published, but the year was mostly marked by important theatrical representations: Così è (se vi pare) (Right you are (if you think so)), A birrita cu' i ciancianeddi and Il Piacere dell'onestà (The Pleasure Of Honesty). A year later, Ma non è una cosa seria (But It's Nothing Serious) and Il Gioco delle parti (The Game of Roles) were all produced on stage. Pirandello's son Stefano returned home when the war ended.

In 1919 Pirandello had his wife placed in an asylum. The separation from his wife, despite her morbid jealousies and hallucinations, caused great suffering for Pirandello who, even as late as 1924, believed he could still properly care for her at home. She never left the asylum.

1920 was the year of comedies such as Tutto per bene, Come prima meglio di prima, and La Signora Morli. In 1921, the Compagnia di Dario Niccodemi staged, at the Valle di Roma, the play, Sei personaggi in cerca d'autore, Six Characters in Search of an Author. It was a clamorous failure. The public divided into supporters and adversaries, the latter of whom shouted, "Asylum, Asylum!" The author, who was present at the performance with his daughter Lietta, left through a side exit to avoid the crowd of enemies. The same drama, however, was a great success when presented in Milan. In 1922 in Milan, Enrico IV was performed for the first time and was acclaimed universally as a success. Pirandello's international reputation was developing as well. The Sei personaggi was performed in London and New York.

Italy under the Fascists

Pirandello was an Italian nationalist and supported Fascism in a moderate way. In 1924 he wrote a letter to Benito Mussolini asking him to be accepted as a member of the National Fascist Party.

In 1925 Pirandello, with the help of Mussolini, assumed the artistic direction and ownership of the Teatro d'Arte di Roma, founded by the Gruppo degli Undici. He described himself as "a Fascist because I am Italian." For his devotion to Mussolini, the satirical magazine Il Becco Giallo used to call him P. Randello (randello in Italian means cudgel). 

He expressed publicly apolitical belief, saying "I'm apolitical, I'm only a man in the world." He had continuous conflicts with fascist leaders. In 1927 he tore his fascist membership card to pieces in front of the startled secretary-general of the Fascist Party. For the remainder of his life, Pirandello was always under close surveillance by the secret fascist police OVRA.

His play, The Giants of the Mountain, has been interpreted as evidence of his realization that the fascists were hostile to culture; yet, during a later appearance in New York, Pirandello distributed a statement announcing his support of Italy's annexation of Abyssinia. He then gave his Nobel Prize medal to the Fascist government to be melted down as part of the 1935 Oro alla Patria ("Gold to the Fatherland") campaign during the Second Italo-Ethiopian War. 

Pirandello's conception of the theatre underwent a significant change at this point. The idea of the actor as an inevitable betrayer of the text, as in the Sei personaggi, gave way to the identification of the actor with the character that they play. The company took their act throughout the major cities of Europe, and the Pirandellian repertoire became increasingly well known. Between 1925 and 1926 Pirandello's last and perhaps greatest novel, Uno, Nessuno e Centomila (One, No one and One Hundred Thousand), was published serially in the magazine La Fiera Letteraria. He was one of the contributors of the nationalist women's magazine, Lidel, and the Fascist daily Il Tevere.

Legacy 

On 14 July 1930, a version of his short play The Man with the Flower in His Mouth, adapted and produced by Lance Sieveking, co-produced with John Logie Baird's company,and  starring Val Gielgud and Lionel Millard, became the first drama broadcast in both picture and sound when the British Broadcasting Corporation showed it for London audiences.

Pirandello was nominated Academic of Italy in 1929, and in 1934 he was awarded the Nobel Prize for Literature after he had been nominated by Guglielmo Marconi, member of the Royal Academy of Italy. He was the last Italian playwright to be chosen for the award until Dario Fo won on 9 October 1997.

Pirandello died alone in his home at Via Bosio, Rome, on 10 December 1936. He refused a State funeral offered by Mussolini and only in 1947 were his cremated remains buried in Sicily.  The Via Luigi Pirandello in Acquaviva delle Fonti is named after him.

Selected works

Major plays
 1916: Liolà
 1917: Così è (se vi pare) (So It Is (If You Think So))
 1917: Il piacere dell'onestà (The Pleasure of Honesty)
 1918: Il gioco delle parti (The Rules of the Game)
 1919: L'uomo, la bestia e la virtù (Man, Beast and Virtue)
 1921: Sei personaggi in cerca d'autore (Six Characters in Search of an Author)
 1922: Enrico IV (Henry IV)
 1922: L'imbecille (The Imbecile)
 1922: Vestire gli ignudi (To Clothe the Naked)
 1923: L'uomo dal fiore in bocca (The Man with the Flower in His Mouth)
 1923: L'altro figlio (The Other Son)
 1923: La vita che ti diedi (The Life I Gave You)
 1924: Ciascuno a suo modo (Each in His Own Way)
 1924: Sagra del Signore della Nave (The Rite of the Lord of the Ship)
 1926: L'Amica delle Mogli (The Friend of the Wives)
 1926: Bellavita (Bellavita)
 1927: Diana e la Tuda (Diana and Tuda)
 1929: O di Uno o di Nessuno (Either of One or of None)
 1929: Come Tu Mi Vuoi (How You Love Me)
 1930: Questa sera si recita a soggetto (Tonight We Improvise)

Novels
 1902: Il turno (The Turn)
 1904: Il fu Mattia Pascal (The Late Mattia Pascal)
 1908: L'esclusa (The Excluded Woman)
 1911: Suo marito (Her Husband)
 1913: I vecchi e i giovani (The Old and the Young)
 1915: Si Gira, Quaderni di Serafino Gubbio (Shoot!, The Notebooks of Sarafino Gubbio, Cinematograph Operator, 1926 English translation by C. K. Scott Moncrieff)
 1926: Uno, nessuno e centomila (One, No One and One Hundred Thousand)

Short stories
 1922–37: Novelle per un anno (Short Stories for a Year), 15 volumes. A selection of thirty stories was translated by Virginia Jewiss as Stories for the Years (Yale, 2021).

Poetry
 1889: Mal giocondo (Playful Evil)
 1891: Pasqua di Gea (Easter of Gea)
 1894: Pier Gudrò, 1809–1892
 1895: Elegie renane, 1889–90 (Rheinland Elegies)
 1901: Zampogna (The Bagpipe)
 1909: Scamandro
 1912: Fuori di chiave (Out of Tune)

English translations
Nearly all of Pirandello's plays were translated into English by the actor Robert Rietti. Pirandello's poetry was translated for the first time in 2016 by George Hochfield. William Weaver is a noted translator of Luigi Pirandello. Frederick May translated a number of Pirandello's plays and short stories in editions published by Oxford University Press and Penguin Books.

Filmography
 Il crollo, directed by Mario Gargiulo (Italy, 1920, based on the play Lumie di Sicilia)
 Il lume dell'altra casa, directed by Ugo Gracci (Italy, 1920, based on the short story Il lume dell'altra casa)
 , directed by Augusto Genina (Italy, 1920, based on the short story Lo scaldino)
 The Voyage, directed by Gennaro Righelli (Italy, 1921, based on the short story Il viaggio)
 Feu Mathias Pascal, directed by Marcel L'Herbier (France, 1925, based on the novel Il fu Mattia Pascal)
 The Flight in the Night, directed by Amleto Palermi (Germany, 1926, based on the play Enrico IV)
 The Song of Love, directed by Gennaro Righelli (Italy, 1930, based on the short story In silenzio)
 La Dernière berceuse, directed by Gennaro Righelli and Jean Cassagne (France, 1931, based on the short story In silenzio)
 , directed by Constantin J. David (Germany, 1931, based on the short story In silenzio)
As You Desire Me, directed by George Fitzmaurice (1932, based on the play Come tu mi vuoi)
 Steel, directed by Walter Ruttmann (Italy, 1933, based on the story Giuoca, Pietro!)
 , directed by Gennaro Righelli (Italy, 1936, based on the play Pensaci, Giacomino!)
 But It's Nothing Serious, directed by Mario Camerini (Italy, 1936, based on the play Ma non è una cosa seria)
 The Man Who Couldn't Say No, directed by Mario Camerini (Germany, 1938, based on the play Ma non è una cosa seria)
 The Man from Nowhere, directed by Pierre Chenal (France, 1937, based on the novel Il fu Mattia Pascal)
 The Former Mattia Pascal, directed by Pierre Chenal (Italy, 1937, based on the novel Il fu Mattia Pascal)
 No Man's Land, directed by Mario Baffico (Italy, 1939, based on two short stories)
 , directed by Giorgio Pastina (Italy, 1943, based on the play Enrico IV)
 This Love of Ours, directed by William Dieterle (1945, based on the play Come prima, meglio di prima)
 Man, Beast and Virtue, directed by Steno (Italy, 1953, based on the play L'uomo, la bestia e la virtù)
 Of Life and Love, directed by Aldo Fabrizi, Giorgio Pastina, Mario Soldati and Luigi Zampa (Italy, 1954, based on four short stories)
 Vestire gli ignudi, directed by Marcello Pagliero (Italy, 1954, based on the play Vestire gli ignudi)
 Never Say Goodbye, directed by Jerry Hopper (1956, based on the play Come prima, meglio di prima)
 , directed by Carlos Rinaldi (Argentina, 1957, based on the play Tutto per bene)
 Liolà, directed by Alessandro Blasetti (Italy, 1963, based on the play Liolà)
 The Voyage, directed by Vittorio De Sica (Italy, 1974, based on the short story Il viaggio)
 Il turno, directed by Tonino Cervi (Italy, 1981, based on the novel Il turno)
 Henry IV, directed by Marco Bellocchio (Italy, 1984, based on the play Enrico IV)
 Kaos, directed by Paolo and Vittorio Taviani (Italy, 1984, based on four short stories)
 Wir, directed by Henryk Jacek Schoen (Poland, 1984, based on two short stories)
 The Two Lives of Mattia Pascal, directed by Mario Monicelli (Italy, 1985, based on the novel Il fu Mattia Pascal)
 You Laugh, directed by Paolo and Vittorio Taviani (Italy, 1998, based on two short stories)
 The Nanny, directed by Marco Bellocchio (Italy, 1999, based on the short story La balia)
 The Choice, directed by Michele Placido (Italy, 2015, based on the play L'innesto)
 The Wait, directed by Piero Messina (Italy, 2015, based on the play La vita che ti diedi)

References

Further reading
 Giudice, Gaspare. Luigi Pirandello, UTET, 1963.
 Baccolo, L. Pirandello. Milan: Bocca. 1949 (second edition).
 Di Pietro, L. Pirandello. Milano: Vita e Pensiero. 1950. (second edition).
 Ferrante, R. Luigi Pirandello. Firenze: Parenti. 1958.
 Gardair, Pirandello e il Suo Doppio. Rome: Abete. 1977.
 Janner, A. Luigi Pirandello. Firenze, La Nuova Italia. 1948.
 Monti, M. Pirandello, Palermo: Palumbo. 1974.
 Moravia. A. "Pirandello" in Fiera Leteraria. Rome. 12 December 1946.
 Pancrazi, P. "L'altro Pirandello" In Scrittori Italiani del Novecento. Bari: Laterza. 1939.
 Pasini. F. Pirandello nell'arte e nella vita. Padova. 1937.
 Podestà. G. "Kafka e Pirandello." Humanitas, XI, 1956, pp. 230–44.
 Sarah Zappulla Muscarà, Enzo Zappulla, Pirandello e il teatro siciliano, Giuseppe Maimone Editore, Catania 1986.
 Mirella Maugeri Salerno, Pirandello e dintorni, Giuseppe Maimone Editore, Catania, 1987.
 Sarah Zappulla Muscarà (a cura di), Narratori siciliani del secondo dopoguerra, Giuseppe Maimone Editore, Catania 1990.
 Elio Providenti (a cura di), Archeologie pirandelliane, Giuseppe Maimone Editore, Catania, 1990.
 Carlo Schirru, Per un’analisi interlinguistica d’epoca: Grazia Deledda e contemporanei, Rivista Italiana di Linguistica e di Dialettologia, Fabrizio Serra editore, Pisa-Roma, Anno XI, 2009, pp. 9–32.
 Virdia. F. Pirandello. Milan:Mursia. 1975.
 Frederick May, Three Major Symbols in Four Plays by Pirandello, Lawrence, Kansas: Allen Press, 1974.
 Massimo Colella, Ritratto, autoritratto, profezia: Bontempelli esegeta di Pirandello, in «Pirandello Studies (Journal of the Society for Pirandello Studies)», 42, 2022, pp. 20-40.

External links
 
 
 
 
 List of Works
 
 
 The complete works of Pirandello in Italian and English section
 
 his bold and ingenious revival of dramatic and scenic art
 Listen to some Pirandello's work in Italian on audio MP3 – free download
 Pirandello's Girgenti. Places in Agrigento associated with his literary works
 Panoramic virtual tour of Piazza Luigi Pirandello in Agrigento
 The Light from the House Opposite (The Panton Audio Library)
 Suo Marito, English translation, Her Husband, by Martha King and Mary Ann Frese Witt.
 
 One, No One, and One Hundred Thousand, translated by William Weaver, published in 2018 by Spurl Editions

 
1867 births
1936 deaths
People from Agrigento
20th-century Italian novelists
20th-century male writers
Italian dramatists and playwrights
Italian fascists
Italian Nobel laureates
Italian poets
Italian male poets
Italian male short story writers
Members of the Royal Academy of Italy
Modernist theatre
Modernist writers
Nobel laureates in Literature
Writers from the Province of Agrigento
University of Bonn alumni
Italian male novelists
Italian male dramatists and playwrights